The Countdown Singers is a name given to Madacy Entertainment's revolving group of studio musicians, used since 1994. They perform sound-alike cover versions of well-known songs. They have released over 80 albums.

Other names
They are also known as The Countdown Kids (on children's releases), Countdown, Countdown Big Band Orchestra, Countdown Country Singers , Countdown Dance Masters, Countdown Mix Masters, and Countdown Orchestra & Singers. The same musicians also work on albums credited to The Starlight Singers, The Starlite Singers, The Starlight Orchestra, The Film Starlight Orchestra, The Starlight Orchestra & Singers, The Starlight Symphony and Starlight Symphony Orchestra.

Discography

#1 Country Hits (#61 Country)
#1 Hits of the 80's
20 Best of '80s Country
20 Best of Country Love
20 Best of Dance
20 Best of Disco
20 Best of Dixieland
20 Best of Love at the Movies
20 Best of Love in the '80s
20 Best of the '80s
20 Country Favorites
20 Irish Sing-Along Favorites (#14 Top World Music)
50 Irish Favorites
80's Chartbusters
90's Chart Busters
All Time Love
Awesome 80's
Best of Bluegrass
Best of Country
Best of Reggae
Best of the 80's (#46 Indie)
Best of Today's Movie Hits
Blue Da Ba Dee: Dance Party
Born To Be Wild
Butterfly Kisses <Album><Cd>
Caribbean Dance Mix
Caribbean Fun in the Sun
Celebration Party Mix
Children's Classic Film Favorites
Children's Film Favorites
Classic Christmas Favorites Disc 2 (Disk 1 is credited to The Starlight Pop Orchestra)
Christmas Classics Redneck Style (#26 Indie)
Classic Country Love Songs
Classic Rhythm & Blues
Country Ladies
Dance Hits '98
Dance Party 2001
Dance Party Mix 2000: Waiting for Tonight
Disco Fever: Play That Funky Music
Disco Hot Stuff
Film Favorites: Music from the Movies (#43 Indie)
Forever 80's (#15 Indie)
Forever Disco (#28 Indie, #2 Electronic)
Hip Hop Grooves
Hits from the 80's
Hits of the 80's
Hot & Spicy Salsa
Hot & Spicy Salsa Hits Vol. 3
Hot Hits: Children's Film Favorites
Hot Hits: Country Hits
Hot Hits: Hot Summer Hits
Hot Hits: The Love Collection
Hot Hits: The Roots of Reggae
Hot Hits: Today's Movie Hits
In A Christmas Mood (The Starlight Orchestra)
Kayleigh
Kiss the Bride...
Latin Dance Party
Latino
Latino Mega Hits
Like a G6
Love at the Movies
Love Songs from the Movies (#51 Billboard 200)
Macarena Dance Dance Dance
 Mambo #5 (#194 Billboard 200, #15 CAN)
Mega Mix Dance Party
Melody of Love
Men of Country
Mob Hits
Monster Mash and Other Songs of Horror (#99 Billboard 200, #21 Indie)
Movie Hits
My Love Is Your Love
New Wave 80s
Non Stop Disco Dance Mix
Non Stop Hits: Rock n' Roll of the 70's
Party in a Box: BBQ Party
Party in a Box: Beach Party
Party in a Box: Dance Party
Party in a Box: Pool Party
Party Mix
Portrait of Broadway (2CD set)
Power Mix
Rainy Day Romance
Reggae Fever: The Best of Reggae
Reggae Sunshine
Rock 'n Roll Reunion
Saturday Night Fever/Grease
Sci-Fi Movie Hits
Silent Night (Christmas Album)
Space Wars
Sports Mix
Tequila Party Vol. 1
Today's Country (#58 Country)
Today's Movie Hits
Ultimate Dance
Ultimate 80s
Ultimate Club Mix
Ultimate Dance Zone
Ultimate Disco
Ultimate Techno
Wedding Collection
Who Let the Girls Out
Who Let the Boys Out

See also
Sound-alike
Tribute album
Cover version
Studio musician
The Hit Crew

References

External links
 Madacy's home page
 The Countdown Singers biography by James Christopher Monger, discography and album reviews, credits & releases at AllMusic
 The Countdown Singers discography, album releases & credits at Discogs
 The Countdown Singers albums to be listened as stream on Spotify
 Countdown Mix Masters  discography and album reviews, credits & releases at AllMusic
 Countdown Mix Masters discography, album releases & credits at Discogs
 Countdown Mix Masters albums to be listened as stream on Spotify
 Countdown Dance Masters discography and album reviews, credits & releases at AllMusic
 Countdown Dance Masters discography, album releases & credits at Discogs
 Countdown Dance Masters albums to be listened as stream on Spotify
 Countdown Country Singers discography and album reviews, credits & releases at AllMusic
 Countdown Country Singers discography, album releases & credits at Discogs
 Countdown Country Singers albums to be listened as stream on Spotify
 Countdown Orchestra & Singers discography and album reviews, credits & releases at AllMusic
 Countdown Orchestra & Singers discography, album releases & credits at Discogs
 Countdown Big Band Orchestra albums to be listened as stream on Spotify
 The Starlight Singers discography and album reviews, credits & releases at AllMusic
 The Starlight Singers discography, album releases & credits at Discogs
 The Starlight Singers albums to be listened as stream on Spotify
 The Starlight Orchestra discography and album reviews, credits & releases at AllMusic
 The Starlight Orchestra / The Film Starlight Orchestra / The Starlight Orchestra & Singers / The Starlight Orchestra and Singers / The Starlight Symphony / The Starlight Symphony Orchestra discography, album releases & credits at Discogs

Canadian pop rock music groups
Madacy Entertainment artists
Musical groups established in 1994
Sound-alike musical groups